The 2017 French F4 Championship season was the 25th season of the series for 1600cc Formula Renault machinery, and the seventh season to run under the guise of the French F4 Championship. The series began on 16 April at Nogaro and ended on 15 October at Le Castellet, after seven rounds and twenty one races.

Arthur Rougier clinched the titles in the general classification of the championship and in the International Series, winning races at Pau and Spa Victor Martins won races at Nogaro, Monza and Le Castellet but lost to Rougier in general classification just by four points, while in the Junior Championship he took the title. Florian Venturi wasn't able to win a race but he scored seven podiums and completed the season in the top-three of the drivers' standings. Pierre-Alexandre Jean, Jean-Baptiste Mela, Charles Milesi, Stuart White, Hugo Chevalier, Marvin Klein, Javier González, Thomas Drouet and Pierre-Louis Chovet were the other race winners.

Driver lineup

Race calendar and results
A seven-round calendar was revealed on 25 January 2017.

Championship standings

Points system

Points are awarded as follows:

French F4 Championship

F4 Championship
French F4